The Men's 400m T44 had its Final held on September 16 at 20:57.

Medalists

Results

References
Final

Athletics at the 2008 Summer Paralympics